Deck is a surname. Notable people with the surname include:

Brian Deck, American record producer
Gabriel Deck (born 1995), Argentine basketball player 
John N. Deck (1921–1979), Canadian philosopher
Nathan Deck (born 1990), Canadian ice hockey player
René Deck (born 1945), Swiss footballer
Théodore Deck, 19th century French ceramicist
Woody Deck (born 1983), American poker player